America Martin (born 1980) is an American painter and sculptor. Referring to herself as a painting anthropologist, Martin's primary subject is the human form. Her style mixes abstract and indigenous motifs and has been compared to the mid-century masters. She credits her Colombian roots for her aesthetic and tastes. Martin is represented and collected internationally.

Family and early life 

America was born in Los Angeles in 1980 to a family of artists. Her uncle is painter Knox Martin; her father is artist, matador, and author Ernest J. T. Martin; her mother is an academic, and her siblings all went on to pursue careers in the arts. She began drawing at age nine after discovering the work of Vincent van Gogh. Shortly thereafter, she began an eight-year apprenticeship with Vernon Wilson, a professor at the ArtCenter College of Design in Pasadena. Martin also worked briefly as an actress, notably as Patsy in Disney's The Rocketeer, while attending Crossroads School for the Arts and Sciences in Santa Monica, California.

Fine art 

Martin has worked in a variety of media, including painting, drawing and sculpting in steel and aluminum. She is best known for her large oil and acrylic nude paintings, and is acclaimed for her command of line and color. Of her nudes, art critic Stacy Davies wrote, “Martin’s women are hyper-real… They are solid, immovable, inerasable; they are present. They cannot be dominated, but not because they are angry or violent or ugly, but because they are stoic and centered and complete.” 
In addition to her female nudes, Martin's subjects include jazz musicians, boxers, Native Americans, street scenes, landscapes and still lives. 

In terms of process, Martin uses her whole body when painting, using the length of her arms to control the strokes. Her move to a new studio in Silverlake in 2009 allowed her to experiment with a variety of new media. It has and continues to act as a venue to host a variety of cultural events that support artist and community.  She traditionally works in collections- painting and drawing a unique body of work distinct to the location of the exhibition.

Career 

Martin has been shown and collected internationally. In 2002, she had her first solo show in Beverly Hills in 2002, and has since been exhibited in solo and group shows. In 2009, she received a residency with the Walter Anderson Museum of Art, with a grant from the Mississippi Arts Commission. She has been represented in Austin, Laguna Beach, Los Angeles, New Jersey, New York City, Ontario, Santa Barbara, Taos and Maine. Since 2017, her work has been displayed in American embassies as a part of the US State Department's Art In Embassies (AIE) program.

Publications 

Martin's first book Insouciance was published in 2010 and features paintings and drawings from her early career. Her second book,Yes, features work from 2009 to 2012. Both are published by Snail Press Publications.

References

External links 
 America Martin Website
 America Martin at the Joanne Artman Gallery 
 America Martin at Carver Hill Gallery
 America Martin at Mark Gallery
 America Martin Tumblr
 Snail Press Publications

Selected press 
 Los Angeles I'm Yours - A Life In Painting: An Interview With America Martin - Oct 2013
 Camden Herald - “America’s take on Maine” Aug 2013
 Maine Today - “Work, Dignity, and Beauty: Q&A with America Martin” Aug 2013
 TheCultCollective.com - “Cult Obsessed: America Martin” July 2013
 Racked LA - “Dan Deutsch Optical Taps Top LA Artisans for New Campaign” May 2013
 Los Angeles Confidential - “Real LA Beauties” May 2013
  Fundschau - “America Martin” Sept 2012
 The Sche Report - “Studio Visit with Artist America Martin” Aug 2012
 Culture Map Austin - “Artist America Martin returns to Austin..." May 2012
 OC Weekly - “America Martin Accepts No Substitutes” March 2012

1980 births
Living people
American women painters
American women sculptors
21st-century American women artists